Leslie George Irwin MM (3 March 1887 – 7 September 1965) was an Australian rules footballer who played with Melbourne and Richmond in the Victorian Football League (VFL). He was awarded the Military Medal in the First World War.		

After fourteen games with Melbourne over two seasons, Irwin crossed to Richmond at the start of the 1911 season. In 1913 he was granted a clearance to South Australia and he played for South Adelaide for two seasons before enlisting to serve in World War I.

Notes

External links

1887 births
1965 deaths
Australian rules footballers from Melbourne
Melbourne Football Club players
Richmond Football Club players
South Adelaide Football Club players
Australian recipients of the Military Medal
People from Moonee Ponds, Victoria
Military personnel from Melbourne